"Picasso's Last Words (Drink to Me)" is a song by the British–American rock band Paul McCartney and Wings, released on their 1973 album Band on the Run. The longest track on the album, it was not released as a single. The song includes interpolations of "Jet" and "Mrs. Vandebilt," the second and fourth tracks on the album, respectively. Wings band member Denny Laine covered "Picasso's Last Words (Drink to Me)" in 2007 on his album Performs the Hits of Wings. An abbreviated performance of the song appears on the live album  Wings over America.

Writing
In an interview on British TV channel ITV1 for the program Wings: Band on the Run, to promote the November 2010 2×CD/2×DVD rerelease of the original album, McCartney says he was on vacation in Montego Bay, Jamaica where he "snuck" onto the set of the film Papillon where he met Dustin Hoffman and Steve McQueen. After a dinner with Hoffman, with McCartney playing around on guitar, Hoffman did not believe that McCartney could write a song "about anything", so Hoffman pulled out a magazine where they saw the story of the death of Pablo Picasso and his famous last words, "Drink to me, drink to my health. You know I can't drink anymore." McCartney created a demo of the song and lyrics on the spot, prompting Hoffman to exclaim to his wife: "look, he's doing it … he's doing it!"

Recording
While recording Band on the Run in Lagos, Nigeria, Wings were invited to former Cream drummer Ginger Baker's ARC Studios in the nearby suburb of Ikeja. While Baker insisted to McCartney that they should record the entire album there, McCartney was reluctant and agreed he would spend one day there. "Picasso's Last Words" was recorded during that time and Baker contributed by playing a tin can full of gravel.

Personnel
Paul McCartney – vocals, guitar, bass guitar, drums
Linda McCartney – backing vocals
Denny Laine – vocals, guitar
Ginger Baker – percussion
Tony Visconti – orchestrations

References

1973 songs
Paul McCartney songs
Paul McCartney and Wings songs
Songs written by Paul McCartney
Songs written by Linda McCartney
Song recordings produced by Paul McCartney
Music published by MPL Music Publishing
Cultural depictions of Pablo Picasso
Songs about alcohol